Ayub Khawar is a Pakistani poet, author, and television director. He directed most of the TV serials for PTV including Fishaar, Khawaja and Son, Pataal, Qasmi Kahani, and Gulzar Classics. He is the author of more than 50 books. He has been nominated two times at the Lux Style Awards for Best TV Director.

Early life 

Khawar was born in Chakwal on 12 June 1948. He got his earlier education from there and went on to Karachi for higher studies. He got his Masters in Urdu literature from the University of Karachi.

Career

Television career 
His career in mass media spans over four decades, from 1976 to 2004 during which he served as head of projects, television producer, and director on Satellite and Terrestrial TV channels. Some of his directorial projects include Khawaja and Son (1985), Nashaib (1995), Pataal (2005), Qasmi Kahani (2007), and Gulzar Classics (2009). Currently, he is serving as the project head of the popular comedy talk show Mazaaq Raat, which broadcasts on Dunya News.

Literary career 

Khawar started writing poems and poetry in his college days. By the end of his education, he was a well-known poet among literary circles. More than 50 books of his have been published which included both poetry and prose, while some of the poetry has been translated into English as well.

Television 
Khawar has directed the following television series:
 Fishaar
 Din
 Inkaar
 Girah
 Hisaar
 Pataal
 Nasheb
 Daldal
 Apney Prayey
 Ali Baba Aur 40 Chor
 Khawaja and Son
 Ghareeb-e-Sheher
 Yeh Bhi Kisi Ki Beti Hey
 Kaanch ke Par
 Qasmi Kahani
 Gulzar Classics

Selected bibliography 

Some of his writing work include:
 Gul Mosam-e-Khazan
 Mohabbat Ki Kitaab
 Love in the First of Terrorism
 Bohat Kuch Kho Gaya Hai

Awards and honours 

 2005-Best TV Director at the 4th Lux Style Awards - for Pataal
 2006-Nominated-Best TV Director at the 5th Lux Style Awards - for Yeh Bhi Kisi Ki Beti Hai

References 

Living people
1948 births